James Grinham (christened 20 December 1798 at Godalming, Surrey; details of death unknown) was an English amateur cricketer who played first-class cricket from 1822 to 1835.  He was mainly associated with Sussex and made 13 known appearances in first-class matches including 1 for the Gentlemen.

References

External links

Bibliography
 Arthur Haygarth, Scores & Biographies, Volume 1 & 2 (1744–1840), Lillywhite, 1862

Date of birth unknown
Date of death unknown
English cricketers
English cricketers of 1787 to 1825
English cricketers of 1826 to 1863
Gentlemen cricketers
Sussex cricketers
Year of death missing
Left-Handed v Right-Handed cricketers
Godalming Cricket Club cricketers
Non-international England cricketers